Account  verification is the process of verifying that a new or existing account is owned and operated by a specified real individual or organization. A number of websites, for example social media websites, offer account verification services. Verified accounts are often visually distinguished by check mark icons or badges next to the names of individuals or organizations. 

Account verification can enhance the quality of online services, mitigating sockpuppetry, bots, trolling, spam, vandalism, fake news, disinformation and election interference.

History 
Account verification was initially a feature for public figures and accounts of  interest, individuals in "music, acting, fashion, government, politics, religion, journalism, media, sports, business and other key interest areas". It was introduced by Twitter in June 2009, followed by Google+ in 2011, Facebook in 2012, Instagram in 2014, and Pinterest in 2015. On YouTube, users are able to submit a request for a verification badge once they obtain 100,000 or more subscribers. It also has an "official artist" badge for musicians and bands.

In July 2016, Twitter announced that, beyond public figures, any individual would be able to apply for account verification. This was temporarily suspended in February 2018, following a backlash over the verification of one of the organisers of the far-right Unite the Right rally due to a perception that verification conveys "credibility" or "importance". In March 2018, during a live-stream on Periscope, Jack Dorsey, co-founder and CEO of Twitter, discussed the idea of allowing any individual to get a verified account. Twitter reopened account verification applications in May 2021 after revamping their account verification criteria. This time offering notability criteria for the account categories of government, companies, brands, and organizations, news organizations and journalists, entertainment, sports and activists, organizers, and other influential individuals. Among all these categories listed, it miss a specific category that fits scientists and religious. Instagram began allowing users to request verification in August 2018.

In April 2018, Mark Zuckerberg, co-founder and CEO of Facebook, announced that purchasers of political or issue-based advertisements would be required to verify their identities and locations. He also indicated that Facebook would require individuals who manage large pages to be verified. In May 2018, Kent Walker, senior vice president of Google, announced that, in the United States, purchasers of political-leaning advertisements would need to verify their identities.

In November 2022, Elon Musk included a blue verification check mark with a paid Twitter Blue monthly membership. Prior to Musk's acquisition of Twitter, Twitter offered this check mark at no charge to confirmed high profile users. On December 19, 2022, Twitter introduced two new check mark colors: gold for accounts from official businesses and organizations, and grey for accounts from governments or multilateral organizations. The type of check mark can be confirmed by visiting the profile page, then clicking or tapping on the check mark.

Techniques

Identity verification services 

Identity verification services are third-party solutions which can be used to ensure that a person provides information which is associated with the identity of a real person. Such services may verify the authenticity of identity documents such as drivers licenses or passports, called documentary verification, or may verify identity information against authoritative sources such as credit bureaus or government data, called non-documentary verification.

Identity documents verification 

The uploading of scanned or photographed identity documents is a practice in use, for example at Facebook. According to Facebook, there are two reasons that a person would be asked to send a scan of or photograph of an ID to Facebook: to show account ownership and to confirm their name.

In January 2018, Facebook purchased Confirm.io, a startup that was advancing technologies to verify the authenticity of identification documentation.

Biometric verification

Behavioral verification 

Behavioral verification is the computer-aided and automated detection and analysis of behaviors and patterns of behavior to verify accounts. Behaviors to detect include those of sockpuppets, bots, cyborgs, trolls, spammers, vandals, and sources and spreaders of fake news, disinformation and election interference. Behavioral verification processes can flag accounts as suspicious, exclude accounts from suspicion, or offer corroborating evidence for processes of account verification.

Bank account verification 

Identity verification is required to establish bank accounts and other financial accounts in many jurisdictions. Verifying identity in the financial sector is often required by regulation such as Know Your Customer or Customer Identification Program. Accordingly, bank accounts can be of use as corroborating evidence when performing account verification.

Bank account information can be provided when creating or verifying an account or when making a purchase.

Postal address verification 

Postal address information can be provided when creating or verifying an account or when making and subsequently shipping a purchase. A hyperlink or code can be sent to a user by mail, recipients entering it on a website verifying their postal address.

Telephone number verification 

A telephone number can be provided when creating or verifying an account or added to an account to obtain a set of features. During the process of verifying a telephone number, a confirmation code is sent to a phone number specified by a user, for example in an SMS message sent to a mobile phone. As the user receives the code sent, they can enter it on the website to confirm their receipt.

Email verification 

An email account is often required to create an account. During this process, a confirmation hyperlink is sent in an email message to an email address specified by a person. The email recipient is instructed in the email message to navigate to the provided confirmation hyperlink if and only if they are the person creating an account. The act of navigating to the hyperlink confirms receipt of the email by the person.

The added value of an email account for purposes of account verification depends upon the process of account verification performed by the specific email service provider.

Multi-factor verification 
Multi-factor account verification is account verification which simultaneously utilizes a number of techniques.

Multi-party verification 

The processes of account verification utilized by multiple service providers can corroborate one another. OpenID Connect includes a user information protocol which can be used to link multiple accounts, corroborating user information.

Account verification and good standing 

On some services, account verification is synonymous with good standing.

Twitter reserves the right to remove account verification from users' accounts at any time without notice. Reasons for removal may reflect behaviors on and off Twitter and include: promoting hate and/or violence against, or directly attacking or threatening other people on the basis of race, ethnicity, national origin, sexual orientation, gender, gender identity, religious affiliation, age, disability, or disease; supporting organizations or individuals that promote the above; inciting or engaging in the harassment of others; violence and dangerous behavior;
directly or indirectly threatening or encouraging any form of physical violence against an individual or any group of people, including threatening or promoting terrorism; violent, gruesome, shocking, or disturbing imagery; self-harm, suicide; and engaging in other activity on Twitter that violates the Twitter Rules.

See also 
 User profile
 Digital identity
 Identity assurance
 Identity management
 Federated identity
 Real-name system

References 

Social media
Identity management
Federated identity
Computer access control
Internet culture
Internet terminology
2009 introductions